28th Brigade or 28th Infantry Brigade may refer to:

Australia
 28th Brigade (Australia)

India
 28th Indian Brigade of the British Indian Army in the First World War
 28th Indian Infantry Brigade of the British Indian Army in the Second World War

Ukraine
 28th Mechanized Brigade

United Kingdom
 28th (Thames and Medway) Anti-Aircraft Brigade
 28th Armoured Brigade (United Kingdom)
 28th Infantry Brigade (United Kingdom)
Artillery Brigades
 28th Brigade Royal Field Artillery

United States
 28th Expeditionary Combat Aviation Brigade

See also
 28th Division
 28th Battalion
 28 Squadron